"April Come She Will" is a song by American music duo Simon & Garfunkel from their second studio album, Sounds of Silence (1966). It originally appeared on the solo album The Paul Simon Songbook. It is the B-side to the hit single "Scarborough Fair/Canticle". It is included on The Graduate soundtrack album and was additionally released on the "Mrs. Robinson 'EP'" in 1968, together with three other songs from The Graduate film: "Mrs. Robinson", "Scarborough Fair/Canticle", and "The Sound of Silence".

Background and composition
The song was written in 1964 while Paul Simon was in England. Its lyrics use the changing nature of the seasons as a metaphor for a girl's changing moods. The inspiration for the song was a girl that Simon met and the nursery rhyme she used to recite, "Cuckoo". It is the shortest song on the album. According to the sheet music published at Musicnotes.com by Sony/ATV Music Publishing, the song is composed in the key of G major with Paul Simon's vocal range spanning from D3 to D4.

Release and reception 

In the February 1968 release of the soundtrack for the movie The Graduate, the song appeared (in a different version) as the seventh track. It is featured in a pool scene in the movie and was used as a rhythmic guide for the editing of the film.

Reviews for the song were generally positive. Matthew Greenwald of Allmusic wrote: "The sense of yearning in this song would later be beautifully echoed in one of the Parsley, Sage, Rosemary & Thyme masterpieces, "For Emily, Wherever I May Find Her." Like that song, it is very brief, yet the shortness of the song adds to the effectiveness and economy of both the lyric and melody."

In popular culture 
Excerpts feature throughout the Korean drama Angel Eyes (TV series). It is the favorite song of the female lead Yoon Soo-wan (Koo Hye-sun) and is the ringtone for the phone of the male lead Park Dong-joo (Lee Sang-yoon) on his return to South Korea.
Part of the song was featured in Season 23, Episode 18 of The Simpsons, Beware My Cheating Bart. Conversely, the musical segment featured a visual gag referencing the poster of the 1967 film, The Graduate, for which Simon & Garfunkel provided the soundtrack. In the 2000s, the song was also featured in an episode of Parks and Rec and one of The Mindy Project.

References

Bibliography

External links
April Come She Will | The Paul Simon Official Site

1966 songs
Songs written by Paul Simon
Simon & Garfunkel songs